Wisak College of Technology (abbreviated Wisak) is a private Diploma-granting College which was established in 2003 in the Greater Accra region in Ghana. It is registered under the Ghana Education Service, Ministry of Education (Ghana) and also approved by City and Guilds of London institute in the UK.

Over 3000 students and ICT Professionals has been trained in Wisak college since 2003 it was formed.

References

Ministry of Education (Ghana)
Education in Ghana